Streptomyces atriruber is a bacterium species from the genus Streptomyces which has been isolated from an equine placenta in Lexington in Kentucky in the United States.

See also 
 List of Streptomyces species

References

Further reading

External links
Type strain of Streptomyces atriruber at BacDive -  the Bacterial Diversity Metadatabase

atriruber
Bacteria described in 2009